Marboz is a commune in the Ain department in eastern France.

Geography
The Sevron forms most of the commune's eastern border.

Population

See also
Communes of the Ain department

References

Communes of Ain
Ain communes articles needing translation from French Wikipedia